The 1996–97 Latvian Hockey League season was the sixth season of the Latvian Hockey League, the top level of ice hockey in Latvia. Eight teams participated in the league, and LB/Essamika won the championship.

Final round

Relegation round

External links
 Season on hockeyarchives.info

Latvian Hockey League
Latvian Hockey League seasons
Latvian